The Hohe Möhr is a mountain, in the Black Forest near Schopfheim in the German state of Baden-Württemberg.

Tower 
On the Hohe Möhr is the roughly 30-metre-high Hohe Möhr Tower, an observation tower built by the Black Forest Club in 1924.

There are also views of the  Wiese, Rhine and Wehra valleys, the Hotzenwald and of course the mountains of the Black Forest.

Access 
The best route is from the Schweigmatt over the southern mountainside of the Hohe Möhr. There is a car park at the Schweigmatt swimming pool. From there it is ca. 2.5 km and 240 metres of climb to the tower along the road to the Hohe Möhr. Also suitable for prams or mountain bikes. There are also narrower footpaths from the Schweigmatt. Another route begins at Raitbach, from the Festival Hall car park on the Scheuermatt (end of Raitbach village). From there it is about 5 km and 420 metres of climbing. Both car parks have a ramblers' information board that displays various paths and linking walks. Those travelling by train can alight at Hausen-Raitbach station and get to the mountain via Raitbach or the Raitbacher Höhe and Hebelhöhe. The shortest route is about 7.5 km and climbs through ca. 580 metres. A board on the footpath to Raitbach gives information on these routes.

Gallery

References

Literature 
Ernst Müller, Albert Rieger: Die Geschichte des Hohe-Möhr-Turms, In: 100 Jahre Turm auf der Hohen Möhr, Festschrift des Schwarzwaldvereins Schopfheim, 1993, pp. 11–22

External links 

 Information and pictures of the Hohe Möhr
 Information, photos and a video on the Hohe Möhr
 Photos of the transmitter on the Hohe Möhr
 History of the tower at the home page of the Schopfheim branch of the Black Forest Club

Mountains under 1000 metres
Mountains and hills of Baden-Württemberg
Mountains and hills of the Black Forest